The Life and Miracles of St William of Norwich is a hagiography by the Benedictine monk Thomas of Monmouth that was written in 1173. Thomas of Monmouth investigated the death of a young boy who would later be known as William of Norwich. In 1144, William was allegedly murdered by English Jews  in the city of Norwich.

The single surviving manuscript of Thomas' work was discovered by M. R. James and published in 1896 with historical essays by James and Augustus Jessopp. It had survived in the small village of Brent Eleigh, Suffolk.

Overview
According to historian Jacob R. Marcus, an Ecclesiastical Latin hagiography titled The Life and Miracles of St William of Norwich details the first complete account of the myth of ritual murder by Jews.

William was a 12-year old "boy of unusual innocence." Initially, William had many Jewish friends and was very well-liked, but he was abducted by other Jews. He was quickly bound and gagged by an object called a teasel. William was then shaven and forced to wear a crown of thorns. Afterwards, William was "fixed to a cross in mockery of the Lord's Passion" and crucified. Like many other martyrologists and hagiographers of the Medieval era, Thomas of Monmouth deliberately constructed William's murder to mimic the death of Crucifixion of Jesus Christ, comparing William to "an innocent lamb" in order to show his murderers as being motivated, in odium fidei ("out of hatred of the faith").

The credibility of Thomas of Monmouth's account hinges solely upon the testimony of a monk and former Jew named Theobald of Cambridge. Brother Theobald alleged that the murder was a human sacrifice and that the "ancient writings of his fathers" required the murder of a Christian yearly. This was allegedly for two reasons: to one day return to the Holy Land and to punish Jesus Christ for the persecution that the Jewish people continued to experience at the hands of his followers. While there is no such commandment for human sacrifice anywhere in Jewish theology or religious literature, Brother Theobald also alleged, however, that the murderers were not practitioners of Orthodox Judaism. The murder was instead ordered at Narbonne, by a cult leader who had declared himself to be the Jewish Messiah and who had cast lots to select where in Europe his followers were to commit the murder.

Writing in 1938, Jacob R. Marcus commented on the legacy of William of Norwich and other alleged cases like his: "Generations have believed that no Christian child was safe in Jewish hands. Hundreds of Jews have been imprisoned, killed, or burned alive on this charge. The Papacy has frequently denounced this charge, yet it is equally true that in numerous instances the accusation of ritual murder was not made except with the vigorous support of local Church authorities. The author, Thomas of Monmouth, a monk in the Norwich Benedictine monastery, was an exceptionally credulous person. Jessop, one of the editors of Thomas's work, believes that our monkish author belongs to the class of those who are 'deceivers and being deceived'. In the specific case of William of Norwich, the evidence, critically sifted, leads one to believe that he actually existed and that his body was found after he had died a violent death. Everything beyond this, however, is in the realm of speculation."

Anti-Semitism
Thomas of Monmouth's account contributed to the Jewish community in England experiencing intense discrimination and eventually expulsion. The 1194 Ordinances placed new taxes and restrictions upon the Jews. By 1290, Edward I expelled all Jews from England.

See also
Blood Libel

Bibliography

 
 Jacob R. Marcus (1938), The Jew in the Medieval World, Union of American Hebrew Congregations.

References

1170s books
Blood libel
Christian hagiography
Conspiracy theories in the United Kingdom
Pseudohistory
1173 works